Andrew Jachno (born 13 April 1962) is a retired male race walker from Australia. He set his personal best (3:53.23) in the men's 50 km in 1988. Jachno is a two-time national champion.

Achievements

References

1962 births
Living people
Australian male racewalkers
Athletes (track and field) at the 1990 Commonwealth Games
Athletes (track and field) at the 1984 Summer Olympics
Athletes (track and field) at the 1988 Summer Olympics
Athletes (track and field) at the 1992 Summer Olympics
Olympic athletes of Australia
Commonwealth Games silver medallists for Australia
Australian Institute of Sport track and field athletes
Commonwealth Games medallists in athletics
Universiade medalists in athletics (track and field)
Universiade bronze medalists for Australia
Medalists at the 1989 Summer Universiade
20th-century Australian people
21st-century Australian people
Medallists at the 1990 Commonwealth Games